Lick Run is a  long 2nd order tributary to Sugar Creek in Venango County, Pennsylvania.

Course
Lick Run rises on the Patchel and Wolf Run divide about 2 miles northeast of Sugarcreek, Pennsylvania in Venango County.  Lick Run then flows south to meet Sugar Creek at Sugar Creek, Pennsylvania in Venango County.

Watershed
Lick Run drains  of area, receives about 44.1 in/year of precipitation, has a topographic wetness index of 417.44, and has an average water temperature of 8.26 °C.  The watershed is 71.2% forested.

References

Rivers of Venango County, Pennsylvania
Rivers of Pennsylvania
Tributaries of the Allegheny River